Raphael Hackl (born 20 October 1987) is a German international rugby union player, playing for the Berliner RC in the Rugby-Bundesliga and the German national rugby union team.

He made his debut for Germany in a friendly against Hong Kong on 12 December 2009.

Stats
Raphael Hackl's personal statistics in club and international rugby:

Club

 As of 30 April 2012

National team

European Nations Cup

Friendlies & other competitions

 As of 15 December 2010

References

External links
 Raphael Hackl at scrum.com
   Raphael Hackl at totalrugby.de

1987 births
Living people
German rugby union players
Germany international rugby union players
Berliner RC players
Rugby union fullbacks